Feuerwerker (ordnance technician or specialist, literally 'fire worker') are specialists in the armed forces of German-speaking countries responsible for the maintenance of ammunition.

From the late Middle Ages until the Early modern period a Feuerwerker was a highly specialised artisan with detailed knowledge of the closely guarded secrets of making gunpowder. Since the 19th century Feuerwerker became a distinguished career in Austrian, German and Russian armed forces.

Germany 

In the modern German Bundeswehr, Feuerwerker is the collective designation to non-commissioned officers (OR5 to OR9) and officers of the military functional service with several years of special training pertaining to construction, maintenance, and destruction of ammunition.

Russian Imperial Army 
Between 1700 and 1917, the ranks of Senior Feuerwerker (Senior Gunner) and Junior Feuerwerker (Vice-Feuerwerker, Junior Gunner) in the Russian Army were used in artillery. They were equal to the Junior and Senior Unteroffizier (Under Officer) in the land troops, respectively.

Austro-Hungarian Empire 
Feuerwerker was a military rank of the Austro-Hungarian Armed Forces (1867–1918).
 
In the Austro-Hungarian Armed Forces Feuerwerker was equivalent to:
Beschlagmeister I. Klasse (Master-Blacksmith 1st class) cavalry,
Feldwebel (en: Master-Sergeant) infantry,
Oberjäger (en: Master-Sergeant) of the mountain troops, 
Rechnungs-Unteroffizier I. Klasse (en: Fiscal master-sergeant 1st class),
Regimentshornist (en: Regiment bugler), 
Regimentstambour (en: Regiment drummer),
Wachtmeister (en: Master-Sergeant) cavalry, 
Waffenmeister I. Klasse (en: Weapon master 1st class) artillery and weapon arsenal,
Einjährig-Freiwilliger-Feldwebel (en:Feldwebel - volunteer serving one year), and 
Kadett-Feldwebel (Officers-Aspirant in rank of Master-Sergeant).

The rank insignia was a gorget patch on the stand-up collar of the so-called Waffenrock (en: tunic), and consisted of three white stars on 13 mm ragged yellow silk galloon. The gorget patch and the stand-up collar showed the particular Waffenfarbe (en: corps colour).

Examples (selection)

See also

References / sources 

Word and tradition in the German Army (de: Heer), by Transfeldt – v. Brand – Quenstedt, 6th increased edition, Hamburg 11 H.G. Schulz 1967, p. 80/§104, definition: Feuerwerker.
BROCKHAUS, The encyclopedia in 24 volumes (1796–2001), Volume 7: 3-7653-3676-9, page 267, definition: Feuerwerker, Militärwesen.
 Rest-Ortner-Ilmig: Des Kaisers Rock im 1. Weltkrieg – Uniformierung und Ausrüstung der österreichisch-ungarischen Armee von 1914 bis 1918. Verlag Militaria, Wien 2002. .

Military ranks of Germany
Military ranks of Austria
Military ranks
Austro-Hungarian Army